Tighiyeh (also Romanized as Tīghīyeh) is a village in Vilkij-e Jonubi Rural District, Vilkij District, Namin County, Ardabil Province, Iran. At the 2006 census, its population was 215, in 44 families.

References 

Towns and villages in Namin County